Mandkheri or Mand Kheri is a village in Haryana, India. It is located in the Yamunanagar district, and is administered by the town of Chhachhrauli. The village has a population of roughly 5,000 people.

References 

Villages in Yamunanagar district